Željko Tanasković (Serbian Cyrillic: Жељко Танасковић, born July 8, 1967) is a Serbian volleyball player.
With Volleyball national team won bronze and silver medals at the European Championships in 1995. and in 1997., bronze medals at the Olympic Games and the World Cup in 1996., and a silver medal at the World Championships in 1998. year. He was captain of the volleyball team of Yugoslavia.

He was born in Lučani.

In 1996 he was part of the Yugoslav team which won the bronze medal in the Olympic tournament. He played all eight matches.

References 
  
 

1967 births
Living people
Serbian men's volleyball players
Serbia and Montenegro men's volleyball players
Yugoslav men's volleyball players
Volleyball players at the 1996 Summer Olympics
Olympic volleyball players of Yugoslavia
Olympic bronze medalists for Federal Republic of Yugoslavia
Olympic medalists in volleyball
People from Lučani
Medalists at the 1996 Summer Olympics
Serbian expatriate sportspeople in Greece